Anthony Edward Wadhams (born 1944), is a male former athlete who competed for England.

Athletics career
Wadhams was ranked as the English number one triple jumper and was selected to represent Great Britain at the 1969 European Athletics Championships in Athens.

He also represented England in the triple jump, at the 1970 British Commonwealth Games in Edinburgh, Scotland.

References

1944 births
Athletes (track and field) at the 1970 British Commonwealth Games
Living people
Commonwealth Games competitors for England
English male triple jumpers